The Democrats and Veterans Direct Democracy Party (DVDDP) was a political party in the United Kingdom. It became the 5 Star Direct Democracy Party.

The party was founded in 2018 by former UKIP member and Gulf War veteran Gavin Felton and other ex-servicemen of the British Armed Forces. John Rees-Evans, previously a UKIP leadership candidate, was announced as the first party leader, and Gavin Felton named as chairman.

The party considers itself to be "broadly libertarian in character". Its platform includes complete withdrawal from the European Union, direct democracy, and stronger support for veterans.

Electoral history

In January 2018, the party said it had 321 candidates "ready to fight seats throughout the country." It stated that it would target voters in Essex. The party stood candidates in the May 2018 English local elections, but did not win any seats.

The party fielded Massimo DiMambro as a candidate in the 2018 Lewisham East by-election, who lost his deposit, having received under 5% of the vote.

The party took second place in a Barnsley local by-election in July 2018; took third in a by-election for a seat on Denbighshire Council in September 2018; They won their first two seats on Barnsley Metropolitan Borough Council in May 2019. Cllr Victoria Felton received 1236 votes taking the Monk Bretton seat from Labour after 22 years. However, as of October 2020 the council website shows that of the two elected Democrats and Veterans councillors, one, Trevor Smith, has defected to the Labour Party whilst the other, Victoria Felton, is listed as Independent. In the 2019 general election, Felton ran in Barnsley Central for the Brexit Party, finishing second.

In Northern Ireland, the party stood two candidates in the 2019 local elections gaining 527 votes, the highest amongst the three new parties in the election. The year before, in October 2018, it ran in the Carrick Castle by-election and came fourth in what is the most prominent unionist consistency in NI.

Summary

References 

Political parties in the United Kingdom
2018 establishments in the United Kingdom
Political parties established in 2018
Eurosceptic parties in the United Kingdom
Direct democracy parties
UK Independence Party breakaway groups